The 2016 Christmas Handball Tournament of Four was a friendly men's handball tournament, held in Moscow, Russia at the Krylatskoye Sports Palace between 08–10 January organised by the Handball Union of Russia as a preparation of the host nation to the 2016 European Men's Handball Championship.

Results

Round robin

Final standing

References

External links
Russian Handball Union Official Website

Christmas Handball Tournament of Four